Christel Martina Roosberg (née Sundberg; born 3 January 1982), known by her stage name Chisu, is a Finnish pop artist, songwriter, and producer. She wrote her first single, "Mun koti ei oo täällä", to the soundtrack of the 2007 film Sooloilua. The song was a hit in Finland in early 2008, peaking at number one on both the Singles Chart and the Downloads Chart and spending seven and nine weeks atop, respectively. She released her second album Vapaa ja yksin in 2009. Her third album, Kun valaistun, was released in 2011 through Warner Music Finland. Another version of the album, Kun valaistun 2.0, was released in 2012. Her fourth album, Polaris, was released in 2015.

Chisu, who was born in Helsinki, has written songs for Antti Tuisku, Tarja Turunen, Jippu, Kristiina Brask and Kristiina Wheeler. During her career, Chisu has sold over 230,000 certified records, which places her among the top 80 best-selling artists in Finland.

In November 2012, Chisu was connected to a copyright controversy in Finland when a nine-year-old girl's home was raided by the police and had her laptop confiscated due to allegedly downloading Chisu songs. The controversy was named as Chisugate by media. It has been alleged that the files the little girl downloaded and later shared, were bogus files disguised as the Chisu album and therefore she did not share Chisu's music.

Discography

Albums

Singles

See also
List of best-selling music artists in Finland

References

External links 

Warner corporation Chisu homepage - Finnish   
  Sony corporation website on Finnish popstars - Finnish 
  MySpace website  - English

1982 births
Living people
21st-century Finnish women singers
Singers from Helsinki
Warner Music Group artists
Finnish pop singers